A series of wildfires burned across Chile during January 2017.

Impact
On January 27–28, a wildfire described as the worst in Chile's modern history killed at least 11 people, including five firefighters and destroyed the town of Santa Olga in the central Maule Region, displacing thousands of people.

Reactions
On January 20, the Chilean government declared a state of emergency in response to the wildfires.

Chilean President Michelle Bachelet cancelled her planned visit to Punta Cana, Dominican Republic, for the fifth CELAC Summit on January 24–25 due to the wildfires.

On late February 2022, five years after the fire Aída Baldini, manager of the wildfire division of the National Forest Corporation, declared that their budget to fight fires had increased five times.

International support

  had more than 130 firefighters in Chile at one point.
  sent firefighting equipment and tools.
  sent two MAFFS-equipped C-130 Hercules.
  provided planes and helicopters.
  provided economic support.
  sent more than 20 firefighters.
 The  sent a team of eight to Santiago.
  sent 69 firefighters.
  has donated US$215,000.
  has pledged aid to Chile.
  has pledged aid to Chile.
  sent four people.
  sent more than 20 firefighters.
  sent 21 firefighters.
  sent more than 20 firefighters.
  sent 52 firefighters.
  sent an Ilyushin Il-76 and more than 20 firefighters.
  provided economic aid.
  sent 64 firefighters.
  sent firefighting equipment and tools.
 The  has donated US$5 million.
 The  sent four specialists from the U.S. Forest Service, and a private company sent an Evergreen 747 Supertanker with a crew of 12. The United States has also contributed US$1,580,000.
  sent 80 firefighters.

See also
 2012 Araucanía wildfires
 2021 Argentine Patagonia wildfires
 Great Fire of Valparaíso
 List of wildfires
 2023 Chile wildfires

References

wildfires
Wildfires in Chile
Chile wildfires
2017 fires in South America